Gerald Haines Houghton (April 18, 1926 – June 1, 2002) was an American football offensive tackle in the National Football League for the Washington Redskins and the Chicago Cardinals.  He played college football at Washington State University and was drafted in the seventh round of the 1950 NFL Draft.

1926 births
2002 deaths
American football offensive tackles
Chicago Cardinals players
Sportspeople from Yakima, Washington
Washington Redskins players
Washington State Cougars football players